Charlene Rendina (née Neighbor; born 18 December 1947) is a retired Australian athlete who specialised in sprint and middle distance events.

Her personal best time of 1:59.0 (hand timed) in the 800 metres, set in 1976, remained the Australian record for 43 years until Catriona Bisset broke it in July 2019.

Competitive results 
In Rendina's first Olympic competition in Munich, 1972, she set an Olympic record (51.90 seconds in her heat) on her way to the 400 metres final, where she eventually finished in sixth place in 51.99 seconds. She was also in the final of the 4 × 400 m relay where she ran a 50.7 leg for the Australian team that came in 6th in 3:28.84.

At the 1974 Commonwealth Games, she moved up to the 800 metres distance and took gold.

At the 1976 Olympics, Redina was eliminated after finishing 5th in the 800m semi-final in 2:00.29. She was part of the Australian 4 × 400 m relay team that finished 4th in 3:25.56 – her leg being timed at 51.6 seconds.

In her career, Rendina won five national championship titles at 800m and two at 400m.

See also
 Australian athletics champions (Women)

External links
 
 
 

1947 births
Living people
Australian female middle-distance runners
Australian female sprinters
Olympic athletes of Australia
Athletes (track and field) at the 1976 Summer Olympics
Athletes (track and field) at the 1972 Summer Olympics
Commonwealth Games gold medallists for Australia
Commonwealth Games silver medallists for Australia
Commonwealth Games bronze medallists for Australia
Athletes (track and field) at the 1974 British Commonwealth Games
Athletes (track and field) at the 1978 Commonwealth Games
Commonwealth Games medallists in athletics
Olympic female sprinters
Medallists at the 1974 British Commonwealth Games